The Malawi blind snake (Afrotyphlops obtusus), also known as the slender blind snake or southern gracile blind snake, is a species of snake in the Typhlopidae family. It is endemic to Africa.

Geographic range
It is found in southern Malawi, northern Mozambique, and extreme eastern Zimbabwe.

Description
Dorsally, it is dark brown, with the base of each scale paler. Ventrally, it is pale brown to cream-colored. The scales are arranged in 24 or 26 rows around the body, and there are more than 300 scales in the vertebral row.

Snout very prominent, rounded. Nostrils located inferiorly (ventrally). Rostral large, more than half as broad as the head; portion of rostral visible from below as long as broad. Nasal semidivided, the cleft proceeding from the first upper labial. Preocular much narrower than the nasal or the ocular, in contact with the second and third upper labials. Four upper labials. Eyes not distinguishable. Prefrontals and supraoculars broad. Diameter of body 43 to 50 times in the total length. Tail broader than long, ending in a spine.

Habitat
This species prefers loose humic soil in forests.

References

Further reading
 Peters, W. 1865. Einen ferneren Nachtrag zu seiner Abhandlung über Typhlopina. Monatsberichte der Königlichen Preussischen Akademie der Wissenschaften zu Berlin, Volume 1865, pp. 259–263.

obtusus
Snakes of Africa
Reptiles of Malawi
Reptiles of Mozambique
Reptiles of Zimbabwe
Reptiles described in 1865
Taxa named by Wilhelm Peters